Pekin is a city in and the county seat of Tazewell County in the U.S. state of Illinois. Located on the Illinois River, Pekin is the largest city of Tazewell County and the second most populous municipality of the Peoria metropolitan area, after Peoria itself. As of the 2020 census, its population is 31,731.  A small portion of the city limits extend into Peoria County. It is a suburb of Peoria and is part of the Peoria Metropolitan Statistical Area.

Pekin's Mineral Springs Park is near Pekin Hospital and the Miller Senior Center. The city is the location of a high-rise residential facility of the United Auto Workers; the location of the Pekin Federal Correctional Institution; and the headquarters of a regional insurance company, Pekin Insurance.

History

Origins of Pekin

Farmer Jonathan Tharp, who came from Ohio, was the first non-native American resident of what would become Pekin, building a log cabin in 1824 on a ridge above the Illinois River at a site near the present foot of Broadway Drive. Franklin School was later erected near this site. Other settlers soon joined him, including his father Jacob Tharp who arrived from Ohio in 1825. They lived near Chief Shabbona's large Indian village of about 100 wigwams, populated primarily by Potawatomi, which was situated along Gravel Ridge, on the eastern shore of what is today Pekin Lake in northwest Pekin.

The county surveyor, William Hodge, measured and laid out a “town site” in 1827. In 1829, the plat was taken to Springfield and auctioned; the town site was awarded to Major Isaac Perkins, Gideon Hawley, William Haines and Major Nathan Cromwell. Major Cromwell’s wife, Mrs. Ann Eliza Cromwell, selected the name of Pekin. It has been stated that Mrs. Cromwell named the town "Pekin" because she thought Peking was on the exact opposite side of the world from the town she founded. In the 1800s, China and the United States were thought to be antipodes- or locations that were exactly opposite of each other on the globe. As such, towns were sometimes named after their supposedly antipodal locations. Another example is Canton, Ohio. "Peking" was often romanized as "Pekin", as in other towns founded during the 1800s (such as Pekin, Ohio).

Nathan Cromwell named many of the city streets after the wives and daughters of early Pekin settlers. It was long held, as first expressed by W.H. Bates in the 1870 Pekin City Directory, that Cromwell was assisted by his wife Ann Eliza in the naming of the streets.

19th century
Pekin was the residence of Nance Costley, known to history as the first enslaved person to be freed with the help of Abraham Lincoln. She was auctioned off to Nathan Cromwell in 1827 and brought to Pekin. Her original case was part of a Probate Court hearing regarding the estate when he died in 1836. David Bailey, a local merchant of abolitionist leanings, sought the help of an attorney friend after he (and Nance) lost the case. Abraham Lincoln argued the case in 1841 at the Illinois Supreme Court, citing the Illinois Constitution and Northwest Ordinance. Justice Breese determined that Nance was a free person and reversed the Circuit Court ruling, stating that “it is a presumption of law, in the State of Illinois, that every person is free, without regard to color,” and “the sale of a free person is illegal”. After her freedom was legally secured, she remained in Pekin with her husband and children. In William H. Bates’ 1870 Pekin City Directory, Nance was included in an entry of notable citizens:“With the arrival of Major Cromwell ... came a slave. That slave still lives in Pekin and is now known, as she has been known for nearly half a century ... (as) ‘Black Nancy.’ She came here a chattel. ... But she has outlived the age of barbarism, and now, in her still vigorous old age, she sees her race disenthralled; the chains that bound them forever broken, their equality before the law everywhere recognized and her children enjoying the elective franchise.”Lincoln attended the Whig Convention that was held in Pekin on May 1, 1843. He was among several local Whig politicians who wanted to serve in the U.S. Congress. To keep from splitting the Whig vote, the competitors agreed to support each other for one term each in Congress.  Lincoln ran and was elected to the 30th United States Congress in 1846, and retired at the end of the term. This single term in Congress was Lincoln's only experience in Washington before he was elected president.

Although Illinois was a "free" state, pro-slavery sentiment was predominant throughout southern and central Illinois, which had been largely settled by Southerners, some of whom were slaveholders before the state was admitted to the union. Cities with pro-slavery sentiment included Peoria and Pekin. According to the 1949 Pekin "Centenary," p. 15, 
"Pekin was a pro-slave city for years. Some of the original settlers had been slave-owners themselves, and the overwhelming sentiment in Pekin was Democratic. Stephen A. Douglas, not Abraham Lincoln, was the local hero, although Lincoln was well-liked, and had some German following."

Nonetheless, there was abolitionist sentiment in Pekin. Among Pekin's abolitionist leaders was Dr. Daniel Cheever, who performed Underground Railroad activities in his office at the corner of Capitol and Court streets (in addition to his property in Delavan which was an Underground Railroad depot) and the brothers Samuel and Hugh Woodrow. (Catherine Street in Pekin is named for Samuel's wife, and Amanda Street is named for Hugh's wife). The sentiment was bolstered by the German immigrants that arrived in the area after the Revolutions of 1848; while there were small groups that supported slavery, finding them would prove difficult as the German community disapproved of the idea.

During the Civil War, the inhabitants of Pekin were divided between the pro-slavery element, who favored the Confederacy, and the abolitionist and pro-Union element. Early in the war, the secessionist "Knights of the Golden Circle" openly supported secession and slavery in Pekin. The 1949 Pekin Centenary, p. 15, says the Knights were "aggressive and unprincipled," and "those who believed in the Union spoke often in whispers in Pekin streets and were wary and often afraid." As a response to the Knights' influence, Dr. Cheever and 10 other men gathered at 331 Court Street in Pekin on June 25, 1862 to establish the first council of the Union League of America. The goal of the League was to promote patriotism and loyalty to the Union in the Civil War and the abolition of slavery. Its members hoped to counter Northern disillusionment with President Lincoln's military policies after early Union defeats in the American Civil War. Although closely allied with the Republican Party, the League sought to enroll all Union supporters, regardless of party. The anti-slavery Germans of Pekin took an active role in the Union League in their city.

German immigration to Pekin 
After the Revolutions of 1848, many people from the German Confederation immigrated to the United States. During the decade of the 1850s, a 118.6% increase in the German-born population was observed. In the 1850 Tazewell County census, nearly 14% of Pekin’s population was listed as originating from “Germany” (272 individuals of the 1,891 listed). In the 1860 Tazewell County census, the portion of Pekin that originated from Germany increased to 22% (774 individuals of the 3,467 listed). The 1860 census also changed the designation from “Germany” to the various states of the German Confederation- revealing that 31% of the German immigrants came from Hanover, with Darmstadt trailing behind at 22% of the population.

Several German citizens of Pekin held status in the town. Frederick P. Siebens, who came to Pekin in 1868, was stockholder and director of T. & H. Smith Company (a blacksmith, woodworking, and wagon building plant). He was also listed as a foreman blacksmith in the 1887 Pekin City Directory. John Herget moved to the United States from Hesse-Darmstadt, then returned to Germany and brought his family back with him to Pekin in 1869. He became a stockholder in Farmers National Bank and was Mayor of Pekin in 1873 and 1874. John’s younger brother, George Herget, was the President of the Globe Distilling Company, the Pekin Electric Light Company, and the Pekin Steam Coopering Company. He settled in Pekin in 1853 after traveling from Gettysburg, Pennsylvania. Habbe Vander Velde, one of the original founders of T. & H. Smith Company, served several terms on Pekin’s city council, was Chairman of the Finance Committee, and a member of the Committee on Bridges and Licenses. He moved to Pekin in 1851.  Aeilt Van Boening was the city’s representative for the Anheuser-Busch Brewing Company of St. Louis. He moved to Pekin in 1867 to be with his brothers, who had settled there in 1866. Van Boening was also listed as a proprietor for City Truck Line in the 1887 Pekin City Directory.

George Herget and Habbe Vander Velde were among those on the “Roll of Honor” in the 1908 Pekin City Directory. Those who were listed were in the 1861 Pekin City Directory and lived continuously or retained citizenship in Pekin since. The list describes those listed to “represent all the varied trades and professions which were essential to the building up of our beautiful city”.

20th century to present
In an early 20th-century revival, the Ku Klux Klan recruited new members as a fraternal organization, opposing new immigrants from southern and eastern Europe, and becoming influential in rapidly industrializing urban areas in the Midwest and West, as well as in the South. It had numerous members in Pekin and other Illinois cities. It was during this period that leading Klansmen took over ownership of the city newspaper, the Pekin Daily Times; they used it as an organ of Klan viewpoints.  They sold off the paper within a few years.

The city had an identity and reputation as a sundown town; it was known to be hostile to black residents and few settled there. On the other hand, some Pekin church pastors participated in the civil rights marches of the 1960s, and U.S. Senator Everett Dirksen from Pekin was integral to achieving passage of the Civil Rights Act of 1964.

Geography

Pekin lies on the Illinois River, and its John T. McNaughton Bridge connects the city to a small area of land the city has annexed in Peoria County. Nearby towns include North Pekin, Marquette Heights, Creve Coeur, Groveland, Tremont, Morton, Washington, Lincoln, East Peoria, Peoria, Bartonville, Mapleton, Manito, Delavan, Dillon, Green Valley, Hopedale, and South Pekin.

Climate 
Pekin, much like the rest of central Illinois, experiences a hot-summer continental climate. Summers are warm to hot and humid with occasional heat waves. Winters are cold (sometimes severely) and snowy, though there are plenty of clear days in the winter. There is no “dry” season- precipitation is evenly distributed throughout the year, though late spring may be wetter than the rest of the year. July is the warmest month, while January is the coolest.

Demographics

As of the census of 2020, there were 31,731 people, 13,706 households, and 8,721 families residing in the city. There were 14,849 housing units. The racial makeup of the city was 92.9% White, 3% African American, 0.2% Native American or Alaska Native, 0.5% Asian, 0.1% Native Hawaiian or Pacific Islander, 0.6% from other races, and 3% from two or more races. Hispanic or Latino people of any race were 2.6% of the population.

There were 13,706 households, out of which 22.6% had children under the age of 18 living with them, 37.5% were married couples living together, 31.5% had a female householder with no husband present, and 45.3% were non-families. 37.9% of all households were made up of individuals living alone, and 14.5% had someone living alone who was 65 years of age or older. The average household size was 2.24 and the average family size was 2.99.

In the city the population was spread out, with 21% under the age of 18 and 18.1% who were 65 years of age or older. The median age was 41.5 years. For every 100 females, there were 96.5 males. For every 100 females age 18 and over, there were 92.3 males.

The median income for a household in the city was $50,838, and the median income for a family was $68,784. Males had a median income of $43,485 versus $30,881 for females. The per capita income for the city was $28,704. About 11.5% of families and 15% of the population were living below the poverty line, including 19.1% of those under age 18 and 6.4% of those age 65 or over.

Ancestry 
According to the 2021 American Community Survey, the biggest ancestry groups were:

 German (7,733)
 Irish (3,516)
 English (3,186)
 European (2,297)
 American (1,880)
 Italian (1,875)
 French, except Basque (1,431)

“Other groups” contained 4,105 individuals, and “Unclassified or not reported” contained 10,738 individuals.

Economy

Coal mining 
All of the coal that exists in the area formed about 300 million years ago; dead plant matter was buried, compressed, and subjected to heat and pressure during this time to create rocks full of coal. Since coal was cheaper than wood fuel and produced more energy, it became very popular and profitable to mine. In Pekin, there were at least four coal mines that existed: the Pekin Coal Mine, Regal Coal Mine, Tazewell Coal Mine, and Ubben Coal Mine.

The Ubben Coal Mine began in 1900 and was run by the Ubben Coal Company until 1903, when Tazewell Coal Company took over production until the mine permanently closed in 1925. Over the course of 25 years, the mine produced 2,089,332 tons of coal. This mine was located south of Pekin Community High School’s eastern campus at S6 T24 R4W. Ubben also managed a second mine from 1911 to 1938 that was originally started by Louis Grant in 1891; they produced 928,146 tons of coal during their ownership, with a total of 1,217,196 tons overall. This mine was located near Meyer’s Lake (formerly Lake Arlan) at S1 T24N R5W.

The Pekin Coal Mining Company (also known as Schaefer's Mining Company) owned a mine (originally managed by David Grant) from 1939 to 1952, and produced 898,610 tons of coal during its ownership. This was a large mine, located under Broadmoor Junior High School, Willow Elementary School, and Schramm School at S36 T25N R5W. When Fred Schaefer died, the mine was inspected and discovered to be unsafe. By 1951, the coal mining business had ended for Pekin. 

The Regal Coal Mine was managed by the Regal Coal Company from 1920-1924, until it went out of business in 1925. It produced 102,287 tons of coal during this time. It crossed Broadway Street in the eastern part of town, with the southern half of the mine existing underneath the Parkway Golf Course and Coal Miner’s Park at S6 T24N R4W.

The Federal Bureau of Prisons operates the Federal Correctional Institution, Pekin.

Arts and Culture

Marigold Festival 
The Marigold Festival is an annual event founded in 1973 to honor Everett Dirksen, a senator from Pekin. While in the United States Congress, Dirksen tried to have the marigold named as the national floral emblem. In support of Dirksen, the community began growing marigolds. While unsuccessful in the national flower contest, Dirksen's hometown of Pekin became known as the "Marigold Capital of the World". The Marigold Festival occurs on the first weekend after Labor Day in September. Activities include the Marigold Parade, the crowning of Miss Marigold, live music, and an arts and crafts fair.

Pekin Public Library 
In the beginning, Pekin's library was organized by the Ladies Library Association. The purpose of this library was “not only to collect and establish a library of select and useful works, but also to promote a literary taste by encouraging lectures, holding discussions, etc.” Both the membership and collection outgrew their space, and it relocated twice; to the city firehouse in 1889 and the Steinmetz Building in 1899. Due to the increase in membership, the Association’s board decided to inquire about the library becoming a free city library. In 1896, the city council agreed to make the library free and appointed a nine-member board of trustees. 

In 1900, board member Mary Gaither wrote to Andrew Carnegie, a philanthropist who was funding libraries for communities all over the country. With donated land from George Herget and $15,000 from Carnegie, a new library was finally built in 1902. However, continued growth of the collection and increased usage resulted in the need to expand the library, and the Carnegie library was demolished in 1974. A larger building was constructed in September 1974 and was the original home of the Dirksen Congressional Center (which later separated from the library and built its own facility in 2002). 

In 1973, President Richard Nixon traveled to Pekin at the request of Senator Dirksen’s widow to dedicate the cornerstone of the new library.

In 1995, the Illinois State Library nominated Pekin Public Library for the American Library Association’s Bessie Boehm Moore Award for their networking opportunities, intergenerational programs that engaged all groups of the community, and services for the elderly.

Government

Pekin is the county seat of Tazewell County, Illinois. Originally under an aldermanic form of government, the city switched to the commission form in 1911 (see Pekin Sesquicentennial 1824–1974, A History, p. 162), but since 1995 has had a city manager form of government. A mayor and six council members are elected to staggered 4-year terms in April of odd-numbered years. Candidates may start circulating nomination papers (available from the County Clerk's office) in September, but must file them in mid-December.

The Pekin Park District was established in 1902 and still operates, controlled by a 7-member Board of Commissioners elected by the public at the same elections the city council members are.

While Illinois as a whole is represented in the Senate by Richard Durbin (D) and Tammy Duckworth (D), the state is split into 17 Congressional Districts for the House of Representatives. Pekin is split between Congressional Districts 16 and 17- the majority of Pekin is in District 16 and represented by Darrin LaHood (R). Extreme southwestern Pekin is in District 17 and represented by Eric Sorensen (D).

Regarding the Illinois Senate and Illinois House of Representatives, Pekin is split along County Road 1700 E into two districts for both. For the western division, Illinois Senate District 47 is represented by Neil Anderson (R) and Illinois House District 93 is represented by Travis Weaver (R). For the eastern division, Illinois Senate District 44 is represented by Sally J. Turner (R) and Illinois House District 87 is represented by William E. Hauter (R).

Education
Pekin is served by The Pekin Public School System, comprising two districts. Pekin Public Schools District 108 consists of six elementary, two intermediate, two junior high schools, and the Pekin Technical Education Center. Pekin Community High School District 303 is the one high school- Pekin Community High School (PCHS). District 303 serves students living in surrounding areas such as South Pekin, North Pekin, Marquette Heights, Creve Coeur, and Groveland.

Pekin Community High School 
The high school was built in 1915, and expanded multiple times to accommodate the growing student population. In 1959, the city planned to widen Eighth Street which ended future opportunities for continued expansion. Subsequently, the school district decided to build a second campus in 1962 and classes began in 1964. With the construction of the newer campus, PCHS was split into West Campus (original building) and East Campus (new building). Freshman and sophomores attended West Campus, while juniors and seniors attended East Campus. East Campus was expanded in 1997–1998, after which date West Campus closed and all four classes were reunited at the newer campus. After the local community lost in an attempt to save the original school building, demolition began in 2012 and was finished in 2014.

Media
The city is served by a daily newspaper, the Pekin Daily Times. In 1873, Joseph B. Irwin and Col. W.T. Dowdall founded the Pekin Times. They had a large task before them to revitalize the newspaper: “When the first issue of the Times appeared [in 1873] there was no subscription list, as the paper had changed hands so often that its reputation was well nigh gone and the outlook was extremely discouraging. But by much hard work, natural ability and perseverance, our subject soon placed the paper on a solid basis, and as a newsy and literary production it ranked among the leading weeklies of the northwest”. The Pekin Times remained a weekly publication until January 3, 1881, when Irwin turned the paper into a five-column daily. It has remained a Monday-Saturday publication ever since.

From September 1923 to June 1925, the paper was owned by Oscar W. Friedrich, a Ku Klux Klan Grand Titan. For several years, headlines were about the Klan’s meetings, policies, and plans. By the mid 1920s, the Klan’s power had declined and the paper was sold to F.F. McNaughton.

Infrastructure
The Pekin Municipal Airport is a city-owned public-use facility located four nautical miles (4.6 mi, 7.4 km) south of Pekin's central business district.

Notable people 

 Ubbo J. Albertsen (1845–1926), Illinois state legislator and businessman
 Robert H. Allison (1893–1959), Illinois state legislator and lawyer
 Scott Altman (1959–), astronaut
 Sol Bloom (1870–1949), US Congressman (D-NY), music publisher, and entertainment impresario
 Mark Staff Brandl (1955–), artist and art historian
 Erik Brann (1950–2003), guitarist with Iron Butterfly
 Hank Bruder (1907–1970), player for the Green Bay Packers and Pittsburgh Steelers
 Liz Brunner (1959–), Miss Illinois 1979 (competed as Elizabeth Russell), journalist-newscaster, CEO Brunner Communications
 Donna Jean Christianson (1931–2015), Minnesota state legislator and farmer
 Wyllis Cooper (1899–1955), writer for radio
 Susan Dey (1952–), actress known for The Partridge Family, L.A. Law
 Everett McKinley Dirksen (1896–1969), congressman and senator, Senate Minority Leader
 Ethyl Eichelberger (1945–1990), noted figure in experimental theater
 Elizabeth Hawley Everett (1857–1940), clubwoman, suffragist, author, magazine founder/editor, school principal, superindent of schools
 Egbert B. Groen (1915–2012), Illinois state senator and lawyer
 Head East, 1970s rock band, most notable song "Never Been Any Reason"
 William Guatney (1922–1996), criminal and accused serial killer
 Th. Emil Homerin (1955–2020), scholar of religion and mysticism
 The Jets, 1970s rock band (not the 1980s pop band)
 John Johnson (1869–1941), 19th century Major League Baseball player
 Larry Kenney (1947–), voice actor and radio host
 Seth Kinman (1815–1888), mountain man and Presidential chair maker
 Danny Lloyd (1975-), actor, known for The Shining, Doctor Sleep
 Martin B. Lohmann (1881–1980), Illinois politician and businessman
 Elaine McCusker, U.S. government official
 John T. McNaughton (1921–1967), Harvard Law School professor and Vietnam War planner
 Eric Monti (1917–2009), PGA Tour golfer
 D. A. Points (1976–), PGA Tour golfer
 George Saal (1918–1996), Illinois politician and businessman
 Jerald D. Slack (1936–), U.S. Air National Guard Major General, Adjutant General of Wisconsin
 Sally Smith (1945–), Alaska state legislator and Mayor of Juneau, Alaska
 Sandra Steingraber (1959–), biologist, science writer, ecologist
 Jack Stephens (1933–2011), guard and forward with the St. Louis Hawks
 James Von Boeckman (1923–2001), Illinois state representative

See also

 Pekin Lettes

References

External links

 

 
1829 establishments in Illinois
Cities in Illinois
Cities in Peoria County, Illinois
Cities in Tazewell County, Illinois
County seats in Illinois
Populated places established in 1829
Sundown towns in Illinois